The United Kingdom Misuse of Drugs Act 1971 aimed to control the possession and supply of numerous listed drugs and drug-like substances as a controlled substance.  The act allowed and regulated the use of some Controlled Drugs (designated CD) by various classes of persons (e.g. doctors) acting in their professional capacity.

In clinical practice, this mostly applies to the use of strong opiates for pain management and some amphetamine-like stimulants used for Attention-deficit hyperactivity disorder; both of which are regulated under Schedule 2.

The Royal Pharmaceutical Society maintains a live database of the legal classification of medicines.

Schedules
Special responsibilities are placed upon pharmaceutical wholesalers, pharmacies and doctors in the stocking, distribution, issuing of prescriptions, supply and disposal of items listed under the first three of the schedules.  The regulations have been further tightened since Dr. Harold Shipman used diamorphine to murder hundreds of his patients during the late 20th century.

Schedule 1 - CD Lic
Drugs which are not used medically, and thus their possession and supply is prohibited; e.g. DMT and LSD except when licensed by the Home Office to carry out research.

Schedule 2 - CD
Substances subject to the full controlled drug requirements; e.g. Cannabis, diamorphine (heroin), pethidine, cocaine, methadone, methylphenidate, dextroamphetamine, fentanyl and oxycodone. Under the Act, a prescription for these drugs need to show full details including the form and strength of the preparation, with the total quantity written out in both words and figures.  It is an offence for a doctor to issue an incomplete prescription or for a pharmacist to dispense a controlled drug unless all the required details are given.

It is the prescriber's responsibility to minimize the risk of dependence or misuse by ensuring that such drugs are not started for a particular patient without good cause, that the dose is not increased to the point where dependency is more likely, and to avoid being an unwitting source of supply for addicts. The quantities of controlled drugs prescribed should match the likely needs of the patients until the next clinical review and prescription forms should be secured against theft.

Requirements for safe custody in pharmacies apply to all Sch 2 Controlled Drugs except quinalbarbitone.

The safe custody requirements ensures that pharmacists and doctors holding stock of controlled drugs must store them in securely fixed double-locked steel safety cabinets and maintain a written register, which must be bound and contain separate entries for each drug and must be written in ink with no use of correction fluid.  Disposal of expired stock must be witnessed by a designated inspector (either a police officer or a suitably qualified official).

Until 2005 prescriptions for most schedule 2 & 3 drugs required certain details to be handwritten by the prescriber, unless he or she held a handwriting exemption certificate.  The Shipman Inquiry however, found that this was one of the weaknesses in the audit system. Whereas computer generated prescriptions automatically left an audit trail which was easy to follow, handwritten prescriptions did not, even though all filed prescriptions are eventually sent to a  central UK depositary. Therefore, good practice now calls for these prescriptions to be computer generated.

Schedule 3 - CD No Reg
Include drugs subject to the same prescription requirements as Schedule 2 drugs, but without the requirement to maintain registers. With the exception of phenobarbitone or related drugs for treatment of epilepsy, no Sch 3 drug can be given as an emergency supply.
Safe custody is currently only required for Tenuate Dospan (diethylpropion), buprenorphine products, temazepam and flunitrazepam (Rohypnol). Neither phenobarbitone nor midazolam require safe custody. Other Sch 3 drugs can be stored in the general dispensary.

Schedule 4
Controlled drug prescription requirements and safe custody requirements do not apply. Included drugs are Benzodiazepines (Subclass CD Benz), other than temazepam, flunitrazepam or midazolam, and androgenic and anabolic steroids (Subclass CD Anab). However CD Benz products- which also include mild stimulants such as mesocarb and femcamfamine, formerly prescribed as anorectics- are illegal to supply or possess without prescription and all Sch 4 drugs cannot be legally supplied without medical authority.

As of April 2014 "Sativex", the cannabis derived medicine prescribed for spasticity due to Multiple Sclerosis, is listed as a Schedule 4 Part 1 drug, whereas before that date it was a Schedule 1 drug requiring reporting and recording protocols (as earlier indicated on this page).

Schedule 5 - CD Inv P & CD Inv POM
Includes items which, because of their strength, are exempt from all requirements other than the need to retain invoices for two years.

See also
 Drug policy of the United Kingdom
 Drugs controlled by the UK Misuse of Drugs Act

References

External links
 

Laws in the United Kingdom
Misuse of Drugs Act 1971
Drug control law in the United Kingdom
Pharmacy in the United Kingdom

de:Betäubungsmittel
hy:Վերահսկվող թմրադեղեր
ru:Наркотики